Leucosyrinx rugata is an extinct species of sea snail, a marine gastropod mollusk in the family Pseudomelatomidae, the turrids and allies.

Description
(Original description) The fusiform shell is turriculate. It contains 10 whorls, the lower half obtusely ribbed. The upper half are concave, subangular, with much curved, rugose lines of  growth. Beneath the suture whorls are obtusely subcarinated, with distinct revolving lines over the ribbed portion, minute and obsolete above it. The suture is profound. The  body whorl and the aperture are striated. The aperture is slightly curved.

Distribution
Fossils of this marine species were found in Miocene strata of Delaware, USA; age range: 20.43 to 15.97 Ma.

References

 T. A. Conrad, Catalogue of the Miocene Shells of the Atlantic Slope; Proceedings of the Academy of Natural Sciences of Philadelphia, Vol. 14 (1862), pp. 559–582+586
 G. C. Martin. 1904. Gastropoda. Maryland Geological Survey Miocene(Text):131-269 
 E. J. Petuch. 1988. Neogene History of Tropical American Mollusks 1-217
 L. W. Ward. 1998. Mollusks from the Lower Miocene Pollack Farm Site, Kenty County, Delaware: A preliminary analysis. Geology and paleontology of the lower Miocene Pollack Farm Fossil Site, Delaware

rugata
Gastropods described in 1862